This is a list of Honorary Fellows of Pembroke College, Cambridge.

 Charles Freer Andrews
 Sir Michael Atiyah
 Sir Michael Bett
 Paul Bew, Baron Bew
 Martin Biddle
 Cath Bishop
 Jeremy Bloxham
 David Brading
 Kamau Brathwaite
 A. David Buckingham
 Sir John Chilcot
 James Crowden
 Ray Dolby
 Sir Simon Donaldson
 Sir Patrick Elias
 Roger W. Ferguson Jr.
 Stephen Greenblatt
 Sir Charles Haddon-Cave
 Christopher Hogwood
 Sir Christopher Hum
 Clive James
 William H. Janeway
 Emma Johnson
 Sir John Kingman
 Simon McDonald, Baron McDonald of Salford
 Dame Henrietta Moore
 Sir Stephen Nickell
 Gerald O'Collins
 Jim Prior, Baron Prior
 George Maxwell Richards
 Sir Mark Richmond
 Sir Konrad Schiemann
 Chris Smith, Baron Smith of Finsbury
 Sir John Sulston
 Karan Thapar
 Joe Vinen
 Sir Alan Ward

References

Fellows of Pembroke College, Cambridge
Pembroke College, Cambridge
Pembroke College